The Steel Company of Wales Ltd was a Welsh steel and tinplate producer.  It was formed in 1947 and absorbed into British Steel Corporation in 1967, British Steel then merged with Hoogovens and became Corus UK Limited.  The business now forms part of Tata Steel Europe.

The company led the restructuring of the steel and tinplate industries around Swansea and Llanelli, building the Abbey Steelworks at Margam, planning a new Deep Water Harbour at Port Talbot, a new tinplate works at Trostre and Velindre.  Trostre came into production in 1951 and Velindre in 1956.

The Steel Company of Wales was nationalised in 1951, becoming part of the Iron and Steel Corporation of Great Britain, was denationalised shortly afterwards, becoming the Steel Company of Wales again and renationalised in 1967.

References

Sources

 Whitaker's Almanack (various dates)

Archives
Catalogue of the papers of the Steel Company of Wales held at LSE Archives

Defunct manufacturing companies of Wales
Steel companies of the United Kingdom
Companies formerly listed on the London Stock Exchange
Former nationalised industries of the United Kingdom
Manufacturing companies established in 1947
1947 establishments in Wales

Manufacturing companies disestablished in 1967
1967 disestablishments in Wales
Engineering companies of Wales
British companies disestablished in 1967
British companies established in 1947